Orculella franciscoi is a species of air-breathing land snail, a terrestrial pulmonate gastropod mollusc in the family Orculidae.

Geographic distribution
O. franciscoi is endemic to Greece, where it is restricted to the southern parts of the island of Dia, north of Crete.

See also
List of non-marine molluscs of Greece

References 

Orculidae
Endemic fauna of Greece
Molluscs of Europe
Gastropods described in 2004